Wheelchair racing at the 1996 Summer Olympics featured as a demonstration event within the athletics programme on 1 August 1996. There were two events, an 800 m race for women and a 1500 m race for men.

Men's 1500 m wheelchair

Women's 800 m wheelchair

See also
Athletics at the 1996 Summer Paralympics

References

Athletics at the 1996 Atlanta Summer Games: Men's 1,500 metres Wheelchair. Sports Reference. Retrieved on 2014-05-11.
Athletics at the 1996 Atlanta Summer Games: Women's 800 metres Wheelchair. Sports Reference. Retrieved on 2014-05-11.
Track and Field Results. Savannah News-Press (1996-08-02). Retrieved on 2014-05-11.

Wheelchair racing
1996
Men's events at the 1996 Summer Olympics
Women's events at the 1996 Summer Olympics